The Law of the Range is a 1928 American silent Western film starring Tim McCoy and Joan Crawford and Rex Lease.

Plot
Betty Dallas (Crawford) is a passenger on a stagecoach that is held up by an outlaw named The Solitaire Kid (Lease).  Ranger Jim Lockhart (McCoy),
who is Betty's sweetheart, is in pursuit of The Solitaire Kid, and in the end, as the two men face one another, there is a mortal shoot-out.

Cast
 Tim McCoy as Jim Lockhart
 Joan Crawford as Betty Dallas
 Rex Lease as Solitaire Kid
 Bodil Rosing as Mother of Jim and the Kid
 Tenen Holtz as Cohen

References

External links
 
 

1928 films
1928 Western (genre) films
Metro-Goldwyn-Mayer films
American black-and-white films
Films directed by William Nigh
Silent American Western (genre) films
1920s English-language films
1920s American films
Films with screenplays by Richard Schayer
Films about outlaws